Kweku Asomah-Cheremeh is a Ghanaian politician and a member of the New Patriotic Party in Ghana. He is the former Brong Ahafo Regional minister of Ghana. He was appointed by President Nana Addo Danquah Akuffo-Addo in January 2017 and was approved by the Members of Parliament in February 2017. He is currently Lands and Natural Resources minister Of Ghana.

References

New Patriotic Party politicians
Brong-Ahafo Region
People from Brong-Ahafo Region